Vladislav Yuryevich Bezborodov (born 15 January 1973) is a Russian professional football referee and former footballer.

Playing career
Bezborodov played for Zenit St. Petersburg, Dynamo St. Petersburg, Dinamo Minsk, and Ventspils. He took a six-year break from football after five matches for Zenit in 1991 to study in the United States, where he earned a degree in sports management and business administration. He made his return to Russia in 1998 with Dynamo St. Petersburg in the Russian Second Division.

Refereeing career
Bezborodov became a FIFA referee in 2009. He was selected as one of three Russian referees in the summer of 2010, alongside Maksim Layushkin and Stanislav Sukhina, to work UEFA Champions League and Europa League matches for the upcoming season. Starting in 2012, he officiated in 2014 World Cup qualifying, taking charge of the match between the Czech Republic and Bulgaria.

Family and personal life
Bezborodov's father Yuri Bezborodov played professionally in 1960s and 1970s for FC Irtysh Omsk and FC Dynamo Leningrad.

References

1973 births
Living people
Footballers from Saint Petersburg
Soviet footballers
Russian footballers
Association football midfielders
Russian expatriate footballers
Expatriate footballers in Latvia
Expatriate footballers in Belarus
FC Zenit Saint Petersburg players
FK Ventspils players
FC Dinamo Minsk players
FC Shakhtyor Soligorsk players
FC Torpedo Minsk players
Russian football referees
FC Dynamo Saint Petersburg players